St. Francois State Park is a public recreation area occupying  of land  north of Bonne Terre in St. Francois County, Missouri. The state park features a campground, trails for hiking and horseback riding, and fishing on the Big River. The  Coonville Creek Natural Area, made up of Coonville Creek and its narrow valley, is found within the park's boundaries.

References

External links
St. Francois State Park Missouri Department of Natural Resources
St. Francois State Park Map Missouri Department of Natural Resources

State parks of Missouri
Protected areas of St. Francois County, Missouri
Protected areas established in 1964
1964 establishments in Missouri